Saint-Maxent is a commune in the Somme department in Hauts-de-France in northern France.

Geography

Population

Places of interest
 The church
 The old railway line  '''
The railway was opened on 9 May 1872 and was used principally from freight, although some passengers were carried. 
It was finally closed on 10 November 1993. It served the following communes: 
Longpré-les-Corps-Saints / Bettencourt-Rivière / Airaines / Allery / Wiry-au-Mont / Forceville / Oisemont / Cerisy-Buleux / Martainneville / Saint-Maxent / Vismes-au-Val / Maisnières / Longroy and Gamaches

See also
Communes of the Somme department

References

Communes of Somme (department)